David Moody (18 November 1834 – 4 May 1915) served three terms as a member of the South Australian House of Assembly for the Electoral district of Light.
Moody was initially elected on 12 June 1878 to fill the vacancy created by the resignation of Frank Skeffington Carroll on 31 May 1878.  While Moody was not successful in the 1881 elections, he was re-elected along with Jenkin Coles on 23 April 1884. Moody was not re-elected in 1887. Then, in 1896, Moody stood again and was re-elected along the Hon. Sir Jenkin Coles on 25 April 1896.

In 1903, the Hundred of Moody, a cadastral division located in the southern part of the Eyre Peninsula in South Australia, was named in Moody's honour.

References

 

Members of the South Australian House of Assembly
1834 births
1915 deaths
Politicians from County Londonderry
Irish emigrants to colonial Australia